Orientale Province (French: Province orientale, "Eastern province") is one of the former provinces of the Democratic Republic of the Congo and its predecessors the Congo Free State and the Belgian Congo. It went through a series of boundary changes between 1898 and 2015, when it was divided into smaller units.

The District of Orientale Province was created from Stanley Falls District on 15 July 1898.
The district was expanded to become Orientale Province in 1913. It was divided in 1933 into Costermansville (later Kivu) and Stanleyville Province. Stanleyville Province was renamed Orientale Province from 1947 to 1963, when it was broken up into Kibali-Ituri, Uélé and Haut-Congo provinces. Orientale Province was reconstituted in 1966. Between 1971 and 1997 it was called Haut-Zaïre, then it returned to the name of Orientale.
The province contained the Bas-Uele, Haut-Uele, Ituri and Tshopo districts. These were elevated to provinces in 2015 under the 2006 constitution.

The province lay in the northeast of the country. Originally it bordered Équateur to the west, Congo-Kasaï to the southwest and Katanga to the south. After being reduced in size, it bordered Équateur to the west, Kasaï-Oriental province to the southwest, Maniema to the south, and North Kivu to the southeast. It also bordered the Central African Republic and South Sudan to the north, and Uganda to the east. The provincial capital was Stanleyville, later renamed Kisangani.

History

On 15 July 1898 the Stanley Falls District became the District of Orientale Province (District de la province Orientale), with Stanleyville as its headquarters.
The Lualaba District in the south was split off at this time.
The district was also called Stanleyville District.
In 1910 the new vice-government general of Katanga was formed the south, with parts of Lualaba District and parts of Stanleyville.

Orientale/Oost Province was formed in 1913 in the Belgian Congo from the District of Orientale Province, expanded to include Haut-Uélé, Bas-Uélé and Aruwimi.
The new province contained the districts of Bas-Uele, Haut-Uele, Ituri, Stanleyville, Aruwimi, Maniema, Lowa and Kivu.
It was divided in 1933 into Costermansville (later Kivu) and Stanleyville Province. Stanleyville Province was renamed Orientale/Oost Province from 1947 to 1963, when it was broken up into Kibali-Ituri, Uélé and Haut-Congo provinces. Orientale Province was reconstituted in 1966 from the amalgamation of the Uele, Kibali-Ituri and Haut-Congo provinces. In 2015 it was dissolved into the provinces of Bas-Uélé, Haut-Uélé, Ituri and Tshopo.

In 1998 the Orientale villages of Durba and Watsa were the center of an outbreak of Marburg virus disease among gold mine workers.

The Ituri district of Orientale was the scene of the Ituri conflict.

As of 2014, militia groups continue to fight in the province and have reportedly committed many atrocities against the local population, such as forcing women into sex slavery and forcing men to work in mines.

Approximate correspondence between historical divisions and current provinces

Divisions
The province was divided into the city of Kisangani and the districts of Bas-Uele, Haut-Uele, Ituri and Tshopo. Cities and towns, with their 2010 populations, are:

See also
 List of governors of Orientale Province
 Kisangani history and timeline

References

Bibliography

External links
 Site of the province (Gouverneur and province assembly), in French
 Bamanisajean.unblog.fr is Governor Jean Bamanisa's blog site.
 Stanleyville.be City of Kisangani Website.
 @Prov_orientale Twitter for Orentale Provincial Government 
 Facebook Orentale Provincial Government
 CDC "Map of the Democratic Republic of the Congo indicating the neighboring villages of Durba and Watsa, the epicenter of the 1998 outbreak of Marburg hemorrhagic fever."
  (1913-1960); +1960-2015

 
Former provinces of the Democratic Republic of the Congo (1966–2015)
Provinces of the Belgian Congo